The Protected areas of Kyrgyzstan are regulated by the law on specially protected natural areas of 2 May 2011, last modified on 2 June 2018. In total, they cover  and account for 7.38% of the country's total area (as of 2017). The first protected area in Kyrgyzstan (Issyk-Kul) was established in 1948. According to the Government Decree on Priorities of Conservation of Biological Diversity and the relevant Action Plan for 2014-2024 the target area for the protected areas in Kyrgyzstan is 10 percent of the country’s area by 2024.

The protected areas are subdivided into seven categories:

Nature Reserves

The Nature Reserves are the strictest protected areas, in which little human activity is allowed. As of 2017, there were 10 nature reserves:

Nature Parks

The Nature Parks are IUCN Category II protected areas. In contrast to the nature reserves, recreational uses are permitted in nature parks. As of 2017, there were 13 nature parks:

Natural Monuments

There are 19 official natural monuments (IUCN Category III) or hydrogeological reserves in Kyrgyzstan:

Integrated Reserves

As of 2017, there were 2 integrated or complex reserves:

Botanical Reserves

As of 2017, there were 23 botanical reserves:

Game Reserves

Forest Reserves

References